is a Japanese-Korean anime series. It is a product of the major anime broadcaster Munhwa Broadcasting Corporation and NHK, and the animation was done by Production Grimi. The director of this anime is Minoguchi Katuya. The story centers on the character Taerang, a legendary fighter squirrel. The series is noted for bearing slight similarities to Jing: King of Bandits.

Characters
The following are the names of the characters in Romanised form, followed by their Korean and Japanese transcriptions.
 Taerang (태랑, テラン)
 Tible (티블, ティプル)
 Chichia (치치아, チチア)
 Rami (라미, ラミ)
 Para (파라, パラ)
 Niverse (니버스, ニバス)
 Trueno (트레노, トレノ)
 Volvoy (볼보이, ボールボーイ)
 Big Magic Kong (대마왕, 大魔王)

Voice actors

Japanese version
Taerang-Sayaka Aida
Tible-Saeko Chiba
Chichia-Runa Akiyama
Rami-Sanae Kobayashi
Trueno, Volvoy-Nina Kumagaya

Korean version
Taerang-Jeong Mi Sook
Tible-Cha Myeong Hwa
Chichia-Lim Eun Jeong

External links
Ki Fighter Taerang at Mimanbu (Korean)

South Korean animated television series
Adventure anime and manga
2002 anime television series debuts